"Blue Moon" is a popular song written by Richard Rodgers and Lorenz Hart in 1934 that has become a standard ballad. Early recordings included those by Connee Boswell and by Al Bowlly in 1935.  The song was a hit twice in 1949, with successful recordings in the U.S. by Billy Eckstine and Mel Tormé.

In 1961, "Blue Moon" became an international number-one hit for the doo-wop group the Marcels, on the Billboard 100 chart and in the UK Singles Chart, and later that same year, an instrumental version by the Ventures charted at No. 54. Over the years, "Blue Moon" has been covered by many artists, including versions by Frank Sinatra, Jo Stafford, Ella Fitzgerald, Under the Streetlamp, Ray Stevens, Billie Holiday, Al Bowlly, Amália Rodrigues, Elvis Presley, Bobby Vinton, Sam Cooke, the Platters, the Mavericks, Dean Martin, Yvonne De Carlo, the Supremes, Cyndi Lauper, New Edition, Bob Dylan, Chromatics, and Rod Stewart. Bing Crosby included the song in a medley on his album On the Happy Side (1962). The Cowboy Junkies recorded the song on their album The Trinity Sessions. It is also served as the anthem for Premier League club, Manchester City.

Background
Rodgers and Hart were contracted to Metro-Goldwyn-Mayer in May 1933. They were soon commissioned to write the songs for Hollywood Party, a film that was to star many of the studio's top artists. Rodgers recalled,
One of our ideas was to include a scene in which Jean Harlow is shown as an innocent young girl saying—or rather singing—her prayers.  How the sequence fitted into the movie I haven't the foggiest notion, but the purpose was to express Harlow's overwhelming ambition to become a movie star ('Oh Lord, if you're not busy up there,/I ask for help with a prayer/So please don't give me the air ...').
The song was not recorded (the movie was released without Harlow in 1934) and MGM Song  "Prayer (Oh Lord, make me a movie star)" dated June 14, 1933, was registered for copyright as an unpublished work on July 10, 1933.

Hart wrote new lyrics for the tune to create a title song for the 1934 film Manhattan Melodrama: "Act One:/You gulp your coffee and run;/Into the subway you crowd./Don't breathe, it isn't allowed". The song, which was also titled "It's Just That Kind of Play", was cut from the film before release, and registered for copyright as an unpublished work on March 30, 1934. The studio then asked for a nightclub number for the film. Rodgers still liked the melody so Hart wrote a third lyric: "The Bad in Every Man" ("Oh, Lord ... /I could be good to a lover,/But then I always discover/The bad in ev'ry man"), which was sung by Shirley Ross.

After the film was released by MGM, Jack Robbins—the head of the studio's publishing company—decided that the tune was suited to commercial release but needed more romantic lyrics and a punchier title. Hart was initially reluctant to write yet another lyric but he was persuaded. Robbins licensed the final version of the song to Hollywood Hotel, a radio program that used it as the theme. The cover of Robbins' 1934 sheet music edition credits Ted Fio Rito (vocal by Muzzy Marcellino) as introducing the song, recorded on Brunswick 7315, October 19, 1934. The song charted in the Top Ten for 18 weeks in Variety, reaching number 1 on January 26, 1935. The song was also recorded by Glen Gray and the Casa Loma Orchestra for Decca Records in November 1934 and Connee Boswell for Brunswick Records in 1935. It subsequently was featured in at least seven MGM films, including the Marx Brothers' At the Circus (1939) and Viva Las Vegas (1964). There are two introductory verses in the original Robbins sheet music edition. Eric Clapton and Rod Stewart sang the first verse in their 2004 version of the song (Stardust: The Great American Songbook, Volume III). The last line of the first verse is: "Life was a bitter cup for the saddest of all men."

On September 16, 2018, an article in The New York Times said that Liz Roman Gallese, a documentary filmmaker, claimed on her website a 1936 lawsuit that "Blue Moon" was written by her late father, Edward W. Roman. The family story was "that her father had sold the song for $900 to buy a car, or maybe that he had 'settled' with the rich and famous Rodgers and Hart for that amount."   Ted Chapin, the chief creative officer of the Rodgers & Hammerstein Organization, said that he had not heard of Gallese's story and that it seemed "a little far-fetched."

Elvis Presley version

"Blue Moons first crossover recording to rock and roll came from Elvis Presley in 1954, produced by Sam Phillips. His cover version of the song was included on his 1956 debut album Elvis Presley, issued on RCA Records. Presley's remake of "Blue Moon" was coupled with "Just Because" as a single in August 1956. "Blue Moon" spent seventeen weeks on the Billboard Top 100, although it reached only .

In Jim Jarmusch's 1989 film Mystery Train, the three distinct stories that make up the narrative are linked by a portion of Presley's version of "Blue Moon" (as heard on a radio broadcast) and a subsequent offscreen gunshot, which are heard once during each story, revealing that the three stories occur simultaneously in real time.

In the movie The Outsiders:The Complete Novel, Presley's version of "Blue Moon" was used throughout this version of the film.

The Marcels version

Background
The Marcels, a doo-wop group, recorded the track for their album Blue Moon. In 1961, the Marcels had three songs left to record and needed one more. Producer Stu Phillips did not like any of the other songs except one that had the same chord changes as "Heart and Soul" and "Blue Moon". He asked them if they knew either, and one knew "Blue Moon" and taught it to the others, though with the bridge or release (middle section – "I heard somebody whisper ...") wrong. The famous introduction to the song ("bomp-baba-bomp" and "dip-da-dip-da-dip") was an excerpt of an original song that the group had in its act.

Reception
The record reached number one on the Billboard Pop chart for three weeks and number one on the R&B chart. The Marcels' version of "Blue Moon" sold a million copies, and was awarded a gold disc. It is featured in the Rock and Roll Hall of Fame's 500 Songs that Shaped Rock and Roll. The Marcels doo-wop version is one of three different versions used in the 1981 film An American Werewolf in London with this version appearing at the end credits of the film. A version by Bobby Vinton plays during the film's opening titles while a version by Sam Cooke plays during the film's famous werewolf transformation scene. The Marcels' version of the song is referenced in the 1962 Academy Award-nominated animated short Disney musical film, A Symposium on Popular Songs during the song, "Puppy Love Is Here to Stay" written by Robert & Richard Sherman.

Chart performance

Other charting versions
American swing era singer Billy Eckstine did a cover version of "Blue Moon" that reached the Billboard charts in 1949. It was released by MGM Records as catalog number 10311. It first reached the Juke Box chart on March 5, 1949, and lasted three weeks on the chart, peaking at number 21.

American jazz singer Mel Tormé did a cover version of "Blue Moon" that reached the Billboard charts in 1949. It was released by Capitol Records as catalog number 15428. It first reached the Best Seller chart on April 8, 1949, and lasted five weeks on the chart, peaking at number 20. The record was a two-sided hit, as the flip side, "Again", also charted.

American country music group the Mavericks covered the song for the soundtrack of the 1995 film Apollo 13. Their version peaked at number 57 on the RPM Country Tracks chart in Canada. It also charted on the RPM Adult Contemporary Tracks chart, peaking at number 15. A music video was produced, directed by Todd Hallowell.

British singer Rod Stewart recorded the song with Eric Clapton for Stewart's 2004 album Stardust: The Great American Songbook, Volume III. Their version was released as a single in early 2005 and peaked at number 23 on the Billboard Adult Contemporary chart in the US.

See also
 Blue Moon (disambiguation)
 Blue Moon of Kentucky
 List of 1930s jazz standards
 List of Hot 100 number-one singles of 1961 (U.S.)
 List of number-one R&B singles of 1960 (U.S.)
 List of number-one singles from the 1960s (UK)

References

1934 songs
1949 singles
1956 singles
1961 singles
Songs with music by Richard Rodgers
Songs with lyrics by Lorenz Hart
1930s jazz standards
Billboard Hot 100 number-one singles
Cashbox number-one singles
UK Singles Chart number-one singles
Elvis Presley songs
Jo Stafford songs
Mel Tormé songs
The Mavericks songs
Jan and Dean songs
Bobby Vinton songs
Bob Dylan songs
Sam Cooke songs
Billie Holiday songs
Dean Martin songs
Jimmy Bowen songs
Gene Summers songs
Santo & Johnny songs
Showaddywaddy songs
Football songs and chants
Crewe Alexandra F.C.
Manchester City F.C.
Doo-wop songs
Pop standards
RCA Victor singles
RCA Records singles
MGM Records singles
Capitol Records singles
Canadian-American Records singles